Lathrothele is a genus of African spiders in the family Ischnothelidae. It was first described by Pierre L.G. Benoit in 1965.

Species
 it contained the following species:
Lathrothele catamita (Simon, 1907) – São Tomé and Príncipe
Lathrothele cavernicola Benoit, 1965 – Congo
Lathrothele grabensis Benoit, 1965 (type) – Cameroon, Congo, Rwanda, Burundi
Lathrothele jezequeli Benoit, 1965 – Ivory Coast
Lathrothele mitonae Bäckstam, Drolshagen & Seiter, 2013 – Gabon

References

Mygalomorphae
Mygalomorphae genera